Zuojiatang is an urban subdistrict, located on the northwest of Yuhua District in Changsha City, Hunan Province, China. The subdistrict has borders with Shazitang Subdistrict to the south, Gaoqiao Subdistrict to the east, Wenyilu Subdistrict of Furong District to the north, Dingwangtai and Wenyilu Subdistricts of Tianxin District to the west.

References

Yuhua District, Changsha
Yuhua District